Caroline Suh is a Korean–American documentary film director and producer. She is best known for her work on the documentaries Frontrunners, Salt Fat Acid Heat and Blackpink: Light Up the Sky.

Career

In 2008, Suh made her directing debut with the documentary film, Frontrunners, premiered at South by Southwest. She directed 2 episodes and produced 4 episodes of season 6 of Iconoclasts. In 2016, She directed the documentary short, The 4%: Film's Gender Problem, about the lack of female directors in Hollywood, premiered on Epix.

Suh adapted the book by Samin Nosrat for a Netflix docu-series, Salt Fat Acid Heat, which she also directed. Most recently she directed the Netflix documentary film, Blackpink: Light Up the Sky, about the South Korean girl group Blackpink.

Filmography

Awards and nominations

References

External links
 

Living people
American women documentary filmmakers
American documentary film directors
American documentary film producers
Year of birth missing (living people)